Jean-Baptiste Blanchet (born 1842 in Saint-Damase, Canada East-died August 31, 1904) was a Canadian politician. He was elected to the House of Commons of Canada in a 1904 by-election as a Member of the Liberal Party to represent the riding of St. Hyacinthe. He died in office while having served for just 198 days. He was also an alderman for Saint-Hyacinthe, Quebec.

External links
 

1842 births
1904 deaths
Liberal Party of Canada MPs
Members of the House of Commons of Canada from Quebec
Quebec municipal councillors